Never Look Away is a mural in Portland, Oregon.

Description
Never Look Away is a mural of eight LGBT activists, installed at the intersection of Northwest Broadway and Couch Street near the North Park Blocks in northwest Portland's Pearl District. Depicted Oregonians include Rupert Kinnard, an openly gay African-American cartoonist who created the first African-American LGBT comic strip characters; David Martinez, a founding board member of the Q Center and a co-founder of Portland Latino Gay Pride (now called PDX Latinx Pride); and activist and musician Kathleen Saadat. Other national figures include gay liberation activist Marsha P. Johnson and transgender rights advocate Angelica Ross.

According to Claudia Meza of Oregon Public Broadcasting, the mural is the "first public art project in the state dedicated to LGBTQ+ community achievements and progress". KOIN's Emily Burris said the mural is the city's first "dedicated to queer heroes". She wrote, "The mural is made up of colorful abstracts representing the struggle, growth and progress in a city known for its progressive policy, while acknowledging the work still to be done."

History
Zoe Piliafas met Oregon LGBT rights activist Kathleen Saadat at a bar six years before the mural's installation. Piliafas has recalled: 

Several people and groups helped the project come to fruition since 2019. In addition to Swan, Ruban Lawrence helped produce the painting. The organization Pride Northwest sponsored the artwork and offered recommendations for subjects to depict. The city funded maintenance and graffiti removal services and the Portland Street Art Alliance offered artist recommendations and production assistance. Additionally, Really Big Video's owners PJ and Maria Harvey provided use of a high-powered projector. Participating artists include Tommy Mack-Davis (known as Nafsi) and Kyra Watkins. The mural was painted in 2021.

See also
 2021 in art
 List of LGBT monuments and memorials

References

External links
 Never Look Away: Celebrating the Beauty and Struggle of Oregon’s LGBTQ+ Community at Pride Northwest

2020s murals
2021 establishments in Oregon
2021 in LGBT history
Black people in art
LGBT art in the United States
LGBT culture in Portland, Oregon
LGBT monuments and memorials in the United States
Monuments and memorials in Portland, Oregon
Murals in Oregon
Paintings in Portland, Oregon
Paintings of people
Pearl District, Portland, Oregon